The 2021 Ýokary Liga is the 29th season of the Ýokary Liga, Turkmenistan's top division of association football. FC Altyn Asyr are the defending champions from the 2020 campaign. The season began on 20 October 2021 and will conclude in December 2021. The winners of the league this season will earn a spot in 2022 AFC Champions League, and the second placed club will earn a place in the 2022 AFC Cup.

Teams
A total of 8 teams are competing in the league.

Number of teams by district

Personnel and sponsoring
Source: Globalsportarchive

Managerial changes

League table

Fixtures and results
The season has kicked off on 20 October. Each team will play two matches with all other teams this season.

Rounds 1–14

Round 1

Round 2

Round 3

Round 4

Round 5

Round 6

Round 7

Round 8

Round 9

Round 10

Round 11

Round 12

Round 13

Round 14

Season statistics

Top scorers

Own Goals

Annual awards

See also
 Turkmenistan Super Cup
 Football in Turkmenistan
 2021 Turkmenistan Football Cup

References

External links
Football federation of Turkmenistan
 Team Entries and Competition Calendar

Ýokary Liga seasons
2021 in Turkmenistani football
Turkmenistan